The women's 20 kilometres walk event at the 2009 Asian Athletics Championships was held on November 13.

Results

References
Results

2009 Asian Athletics Championships
Racewalking at the Asian Athletics Championships
2009 in women's athletics